SHR9352 is a drug which acts as a potent and selective biased agonist at the μ-opioid receptor, selective for activation of the G-protein signalling pathway over β-arrestin 2 recruitment. It was structurally derived from oliceridine by replacing the benzylic side chain with a cyclised group, although only some compounds in the series retained the desired biased agonist profile, with some derivatives such as compound 12 being potent, unbiased μ-opioid full agonists.

See also 
 PZM21
 SR-17018
 TRV734

References

External links

Mu-opioid receptor agonists
Dithiolanes
2-Pyridyl compounds
Spiro compounds